Under the Influence is the seventeenth studio album by British hard rock band Foghat.
Kim Simmonds, the guitarist of Savoy Brown, which Earl and two other men left to form Foghat, makes an appearance. Also, Nick Jameson, who played bass on "Slow Ride," sat in on a new version of their biggest hit which celebrates the 40th anniversary of the song.
The band launched a Pledgemusic Campaign on 10 November 2015. The album is completely fan-funded.

Track listing

Personnel
 Bryan Bassett – lead, slide guitar, background vocals (tracks 1-6, 8-12)
 Roger Earl – drums, background vocals (all tracks)
 Charlie Huhn – lead vocals, rhythm guitar (tracks 1-4, 6-9, 12)
 Craig MacGregor – bass guitar (tracks 2, 4-7, 10-12)
 Nick Jameson – bass guitar (tracks 1, 8, 12)
 Rodney O'Quinn – bass guitar, background vocals (tracks 3, 9)
 Kim Simmonds – guitar (tracks 1, 5, 7)
 Scott Holt – guitar, vocals (tracks 1, 4-5, 7-8, 10-11)
 Dana Fuchs – vocals (tracks 6, 10)
 Tom Hambridge - percussion (tracks 6, 9)

Charts

References

External links
 Foghat

2016 albums
Foghat albums